Hypselodoris katherinae is a species of sea slug or dorid nudibranch, a marine gastropod mollusc in the family Chromodorididae.

Distribution
This nudibranch was described from Pulau Chebeh, off the NW tip of Tioman Island, eastern Malaysia, . It is also reported from the Philippines, Indonesia and Taiwan.

Description
Hypselodoris katherinae has previously been confused with Hypselodoris carnea. The mantle is translucent pale pink with a series of longitudinal red-brown lines running down its length. These lines may be broken into short segments and may branch and anastomose. Small blue-purple diffuse spots are arranged at the mantle margin and may coalesce into a continuous line. The gills are white with orange lines on the rachis and the rhinophores are red to orange in colour. This species can reach a total length of 32 mm.

References

Chromodorididae
Gastropods described in 2018